Tong Djoe (26 September 1926 – 8 February 2021) was an Indonesian businessman. He was the President of Tunas Group Pte. Ltd., based out of Singapore. He also helped play a key role in diplomatic relations between Indonesia and China. He had a close relationship with President Sukarno, helping forge trading ties with him and Mao Zedong.

He died in Jakarta on 8 February 2021 at the age of 94.

References

1926 births
2021 deaths
Indonesian businesspeople
Indonesian people of Chinese descent
Indonesian Hokkien people
People from Medan